Hell's Half Acre, Hell's Half-Acre, Hell's Half-acre, or Hell's Halfacre may refer to:

Places

Communities 
Half Acre, Alabama, originally known as Hell's Half Acre, a community in Marengo County 
Hells Halfacre, Kentucky, a community in Harrison County
Hell's Half Acre, a former historic area in Downtown Los Angeles, California, known for crime and prostitution

Geologic features 
Hell's Half Acre, a side slot canyon in Aravaipa Canyon, Arizona
Hell's Half Acre (Hot Springs, Arkansas), a talus hillside on Indian Mountain near Hot Springs, Arkansas
Hell's Half Acre Lava Field, a basaltic lava field on the Snake River Plain, Idaho
Hell's Half Acre, the rapids immediately upstream of the American side of Niagara Falls
Hell's Half Acre (Wyoming), a unique escarpment in Natrona County, Wyoming
Hell's Half Acre, old name for Midway Geyser Basin, one of the Geothermal areas of Yellowstone National Park

Historic 
A corner of Chinatown, Honolulu, Hawaii, and setting of the 1954 film noir by the same name
A red light district in late 19th-century Omaha, Nebraska; also called Burnt District
A battlefield during the 1863 Civil War Battle of Stones River, Tennessee
A notorious section of Nashville, Tennessee in the late 1800s
Hell's Half Acre (Fort Worth), a former saloon district in the early days of Fort Worth, Texas
An area of slave trading and jails in the 1800s, including Lumpkin's jail, Richmond, Virginia

Film 
Hell's Half Acre (1954 film), a 1954 film noir
Hell's Half Acre (2006 film), a 2006 horror film

Literature 
Hell's Half Acre (novel), a novel by Will Christopher Baer
Hell's Half Acre, a novel in the Walker, Texas Ranger series by James Reasoner

Music 
Hell's Half Acre, name of William Control's recording studio
Hell's Half Acre (album), a 1996 album by Jolene
Hell's Half Acre (song), a song on the 1987 album Robbie Robertson

Sports 
Hell's Half Acre, a nickname for Amon G. Carter Stadium, Texas Christian University, Fort Worth, Texas

See also 
Hell's Hundred Acres
Devil's Half-Acre (disambiguation)